Helios-44 is a Soviet copy of the Carl Zeiss Biotar 58mm ƒ/2 lens produced under the Helios lens brand. The lens is currently made in Russia for the M42 lens mount.

Specification
 Distance scale: 0.5 m to ∞
 Aperture: f/2 - f/16
 Focal Length: 58 mm
 Mount: M39, M42, Pentax-K, Zenit-D, Canon EF
 Mount thread for Attachments: M52 x 0.75
 Weight: 230 g
 Resolution: 50/30 lines per millimeter

References

Soviet photographic lenses

ru:Гелиос (объектив)